Omya is a producer of industrial minerals, mainly fillers and pigments derived from calcium carbonate and dolomite, and a worldwide distributor of specialty chemicals.

The company's major markets are forest products (fiber-based products such as paper, board and tissue), polymers, building materials (paints, coatings, sealants, adhesives and construction materials) as well as life sciences (food, feed, pharmaceuticals, cosmetics, environmental products and agriculture).

Founded in 1884 in Switzerland, Omya has a global presence extending to more than 175 locations in over 50 countries with 8,000 employees.

References

External links
Official Site

Chemical companies established in 1884
Swiss companies established in 1884
Chemical companies of Switzerland